Paul Doolin (born 26 March 1963, in Dublin) is an Irish former footballer and manager. Who  mostly recently managed NIFL Premiership side Portadown.

Career
He played for Bohemians, scoring on his debut on 13 September 1981. In April 1983 he played for the League of Ireland XI U21s against their Italian League counterparts who included Roberto Mancini and Gianluca Vialli in their team.

In June 1985 he signed for Shamrock Rovers and in his three years at the club won the double twice scoring 30 goals in 107 appearances. In his first season at Milltown he was the club's top goalscorer with 11 goals. He made six appearances in European competition for the Hoops and played for the League of Ireland XI in 5 Olympics qualifiers.

In 1988, he joined Derry City, where he won a domestic treble in 1989. In his two seasons he scored 29 goals in 92 appearances. He then joined Portadown and became the only player to win a League and Cup double both north and south of the border.

In November 1991 he again signed for Shamrock Rovers, but this spell was less successful and Doolin left after 1 goal in 21 appearances to join Shelbourne where he won the FAI Cup in 1993. In August 1996, he had his second spell at Bohemians before moving to Dundalk and then returning to Shelbourne and helping them to the double of the league championship and FAI Cup in 2000.

Since his retirement, Doolin has moved into management and first took the reins at UCD, but left to take over at Drogheda with the Students 11 points adrift at the bottom of the table en route to a first relegation in 15 years. At Drogheda United, he led them to a first ever FAI Cup success (2005), as well as successive Setanta Sports Cup victories in 2006 and 2007, defeating Cork City (twice) and Linfield respectively. He also led them to a first ever League title in 2007.

Having parted ways with Drogheda due to the club's precarious financial situation, Doolin joined Cork City as manager on 13 January 2009 on a two-year, full-time contract. Despite the team finishing 3rd in the 2009 League of Ireland Premier Division, Doolin resigned in November of that year, following a series of off-field financial problems at the club. In September 2010, Doolin was named as manager of the Republic of Ireland under-19 side.

On the 18th of August 2021, Doolin was named as manager of League of Ireland First Division club Athlone Town.

In 2022 Doolin would make his return to football management with former club Portadown in Northern Ireland. However he resigned in October

Honours

As a player
League of Ireland : 4
 Shamrock Rovers – 1985–86, 1986–87
 Derry City F.C. – 1988–89
 Shelbourne F.C. – 1999–2000
FAI Cup: 6
 Shamrock Rovers – 1986, 1987
 Derry City F.C. – 1989, 1995
 Shelbourne F.C. – 1993, 2000
League of Ireland Cup: 1
 Derry City F.C. – 1988/89
LFA President's Cup
 Bohemians F.C. – 1997/98
Irish League
 Portadown F.C. – 1990/91
Irish Cup: 
 Portadown 1990/91
Ulster Cup: 
 Portadown 1990/1991
PFAI Player of the Year : 2
 Shamrock Rovers – 1985/86
 Derry City F.C. – 1988/89

As a manager
League of Ireland : 
 Drogheda United – 2007
FAI Cup : 1
 Drogheda United – 2005
Setanta Sports Cup : 2
 Drogheda United – 2006, 2007
SWAI Personality of the Year: 2
University College Dublin F.C. – 2001/02
Drogheda United – 2007

Sources 
 The Hoops by Paul Doolin and Robert Goggins
 The Four-in-a-Row Story by Robert Goggins

References

1963 births
Living people
Association footballers from County Dublin
Republic of Ireland association footballers
Association football midfielders
Republic of Ireland football managers
University College Dublin A.F.C. managers
Drogheda United F.C. managers
Cork City F.C. managers
Athlone Town A.F.C. managers
League of Ireland managers
Bohemian F.C. players
Shamrock Rovers F.C. players
Derry City F.C. players
Shelbourne F.C. players
University College Dublin A.F.C. players
League of Ireland players
Portadown F.C. players
Dundalk F.C. players
NIFL Premiership players
League of Ireland XI players
Portadown F.C. managers